The Synchronized swimming competition at the 2010 Central American and Caribbean Games was held in Mayagüez, Puerto Rico. 

The tournament was scheduled to be held from 25–31 July at the Natatorio RUM in Mayagüez.

Medal summary

Women's events

References

External links

Events at the 2010 Central American and Caribbean Games
July 2010 sports events in North America
Qualification tournaments for the 2011 Pan American Games